"Can't Leave Without It" (stylized in all lowercase) is a song by American rapper 21 Savage from his second studio album I Am > I Was (2018). It features American rappers Lil Baby and Gunna, and was produced by Wheezy and Cubeatz.

Composition
The song contains dark piano keys and flute in the production. In his verse, 21 Savage raps about keeping a gun for protection.

Charts

Certifications

References

2018 songs
21 Savage songs
Lil Baby songs
Gunna (rapper) songs
Song recordings produced by Wheezy (record producer)
Song recordings produced by Cubeatz
Songs written by 21 Savage
Songs written by Lil Baby
Songs written by Gunna (rapper)
Songs written by Wheezy (record producer)
Songs written by Kevin Gomringer
Songs written by Tim Gomringer